Saint-Quentin-Fallavier is a commune in the Isère department, and the Auvergne-Rhône-Alpes region, in southeastern France.

Geography
The city is backed by a series of hills, the beginnings of the Prealps. Saint-Quentin Fallavier was part of the new town of L'Isle d'Abeau transformed in 2007 into the Communauté d'agglomération Porte de l'Isère (CAPI).

The Bourbre river flows north through the northeastern part of the commune.

History

The site of Saint-Quentin-Fallavier has been occupied since prehistoric times. A Gallo-Roman necropolis and a hydraulic structure of the 2nd century were discovered on the spot. A first château already existed in the 13th century and, after acquiring it in 1250, the counts of Savoy enlarged and strengthened it. At the end of the border conflict between Savoy and Dauphiné, the castle was gradually abandoned in favour of the fortified house of Allinges.

Iron mines were exploited in the 19th century.

By a presidential decree of 2 July 1885, Fallavier was attached to Saint-Quentin to form a single commune: Saint-Quentin-Fallavier.

The creation of the new Lyon-Satolas Airport (now Lyon-Saint-Exupéry), and the birth of the new city, have allowed the creation of a sizeable European zone of activity, which is partly in the commune. The existence of Saint-Quentin-Fallavier is also favoured by the proximity of the Lyon conurbation.

2015 Gas factory attack

On 26 June 2015, a man was found beheaded with Arabic inscriptions on the head. This was following an explosion at the Air Product gas factory in the area, after a man drove into the factory site and exploded gas canisters, in an attempt to blow up the building. It is seen as a terrorist attack linked with Islamic State.

Heraldry

Politics and administration

Political trends and results

List of mayors
In 2010, the commune of Saint-Quentin-Fallavier was awarded with the label " @@@".

Transport

The commune is served by:

Road: A43 (Lyon-Chambéry-Grenoble), .
Coach:  routes 1920 (Lyon - Bourgoin-Jallieu) and 1390.
Bus:  network of the CAPI route A ( - L'Isle-d'Abeau).

Passage through Saint-Quentin-Fallavier by a rail bypass of the Lyon agglomeration is still under consideration.

Population

Local culture and heritage

Places and monuments

The Natural Space of Saint-Quentin-Fallavier, a protected and classified area, encompasses:

The Château de Fallavier (13th century) includes two enclosures and a circular keep. It offers an exceptional panoramic view. It is also the place where some episodes of the television series Kaamelott were shot during the scenes of the castle of books I-III.
The  (14th century), listed as an historic monument by decree of 27 July 2010.
The hamlet of Fessy (traditional rural architecture, some parts date back to the Middle Ages).
 to Monthion. Its Roman vestiges were subject to a classification as an historic monument by order of 5 January 1950.
Saint-Quentin-Fallavier and the Allinges lakes.
Part of the marshes of the Bourbre.
The Hill of the Relong, which houses the astronomy club, Sirius of Villefontaine (neighbouring).

Natural heritage

Stone with cupules of Saint-Quentin (Stone of the Valley of the Fuly). Moved. Lodged at the flank of the Church of St-Quentin-Fallavier.

Cultural heritage
Museum of rural life

Floral and green spaces
In 2014, the commune of Saint-Quentin-Fallavier has the label ville fleurie [floral city] with '1 flower' awarded by the National Council of cities and villages of France in the Floral contest of cities and villages.

Education
The commune has six schools and one college:

Marronniers kindergarten, Rue des Marronniers
Marronniers primary school, Rue des Marronniers
Tilleuls primary school, Rue du Lac
Bellevue kindergarten, Rue du Loup
Primary school in Des Moines, in the Des Moines quarter
Françoise Dolto primary school (private), Rue Centrale
Allinges college, Rue du Lac, offering a bilingual option: English/German.

Economy
The industrial estate counts 283 businesses with a total of 11,200 employees. The main employer is the logistics sector; other sectors include mainly construction and other service activities.

Agriculture

Industry
The Thermador plumbing company, created after 1968, employs 257 staff and has a turnover of €194 million. The wage grid lies in the range of 1 to 10 and all salaries are open and discussed publicly.

Martinet SA company has located its headquarters in Saint-Quentin-Fallavier.

Service activities
Branch lines are numerous, and a future extension to Italy and especially Turin is still relevant (Lyon-Turin Line).

The  company has located its customer service returns depot in Saint-Quentin-Fallavier.

International relations
The commune is twinned with:

 Freigericht, Germany, since 1971.
 Gallicano nel Lazio, Italy, since 2002.

Personalities linked to the commune
French football player Jérémie Bréchet was trained at the OSQ football of Saint-Quentin-Fallavier.

The historian  did his primary studies at Saint-Quentin-Fallavier.

See also
Communes of the Isère department

References

Bibliography

External links

Communes of Isère